The Antidote is the fifth album by Morcheeba, released in May 2005. It featured Daisy Martey on vocals, who replaced Skye Edwards. It was the band's first album with Echo Records. The album reached 17 on the UK Albums Chart.

Singles 
The album was supported by three singles; "Lighten Up", "Everybody Loves a Loser" and "Wonders Never Cease". The latter was co-written by Jody Sternberg who would later join the band on tour.

Critical reception 
Pitchfork gave the album a 2.7 out of ten, remarking that Daisy Martey replacing singer Skye Edwards was like "an Angela Lansbury replacing a Marilyn Monroe".

Most reviews were more favourable, if somewhat tepid. Prefix Magazine gave it a six out of ten, noting the new direction of the band was "definitely welcome." PopMatters called it a solid album, but argued that Martey's style played against the Godfrey brothers' strengths, referring to the majority of the album as a "disappointment". BBC Music, on the other hand, delivered a strong recommendation, noting its eclectic style, and ending its positive review with "For the malaise brought on by much of today's dance-by-numbers, it's an antidote, indeed."

Track listing 
All tracks written by P.Godfrey, R.Godfrey, D. Martey except track 1 - written by P.Godfrey, R.Godfrey, J. Sternberg.

Charts

References 

Morcheeba albums
2005 albums